Ramasamypuram  is a village in the Aranthangirevenue block of Pudukkottai district, Tamil Nadu, India.

Demographics 

As per the 2001 census, Ramasamypuram had a total population of 1088 with 537 males and 551 females. Out of the total population 647 people were literate.

References

Villages in Pudukkottai district